South Kent College (SKC) was a college of further and higher education in southeast England. The main campus was in Folkestone, with satellites in Dover and at several sites in Ashford. Following a KPMG report in 2008 that recommended a merger, in April 2010 SKC joined West Kent College to form South & West Kent College, trading as K College.

Campuses 
 Ashford
 South Kent College & Ashford Sixth Form Centre, Jemmett Road 
 Ashford School of Art & Design, Tufton Street
 Ashford School of Art & Design, Henwood Industrial Estate
An "Ashford Learning Campus" was proposed, teaching up to 14,000 students from 2011. After the merger, this was replaced with a £20m plan for a new campus at the Elwick Road site in spring 2013 and the sale of the Jemmet Road site.
 Dover Campus
 Folkestone Campus

Notable former pupils 

 Richard Huckle, serial child sex offender
 Dominic King, radio broadcaster

References

External links
 Official website (archived at the Wayback Machine on 15 April 2009)

 

Dover District
Ashford, Kent
Higher education colleges in England
Further education colleges in Kent